Ora (stylised as ORA) or Euler is a Chinese marque of electric passenger cars by Great Wall Motors, introduced in 2018.

History
Great Wall Motors announced the creation of the new Ora brand, dedicated to a new line of electric cars, in May 2018. 

According to Great Wall Motors, Ora stands for ‘open, reliable and alternative’.

At the time, the brand was launched with two initial models: the crossover iQ5 (now iQ) and city car R1 (now Black Cat).

Sales of the iQ officially kicked off the brand in August 2018.

The third Ora model R2 (now White Cat) was first previewed in June 2019, with production officially beginning in July, 2020.

The naming of the 'cat' series vehicles is reportedly based on a Deng Xiaoping's famous quote: "No matter if it is a white cat or a black cat; as long as it can catch mice, it is a good cat."

Ora launched in Europe, Thailand, Malaysia, South Africa, and Australia in late 2022.

Vehicles

Current 
 Ora Good Cat  — electric compact hatchback
 Ora Punk Cat — retro-styled electric mid-size hatchback
 Ora Lightning Cat — electric sport fastback

Discontinued 
 Ora iQ (2018—2020)
 Ora R1/Black Cat (2019—2022)
 Ora R2/White Cat (2020—2022)

Concept 
 Ora Futurist — retro-styled two-door coupe
 Ora Big Cat — experimental electric compact SUV based on the Wey Macchiato

References

External links 

 Ora at Great Wall Motors' global website
 Ora's Chinese website

Great Wall Motors
Car brands
Chinese brands